Crédit Agricole Corporate and Investment Bank (Crédit Agricole CIB, formerly Crédit Agricole Indosuez then Calyon) is Crédit Agricole's corporate and investment banking entity. With a staff of 8,940 employees (excluding private banking) in 32 countries, Crédit Agricole CIB is active in a broad range of capital markets, investment banking and financing activities. Clients are primarily corporates, governments, and banks, with a small footprint in the investor segment.

History

Crédit Agricole Indosuez (CAI) was created in 1996 with the purchase of Banque Indosuez by Crédit Agricole. Calyon was created in May 2004 by the transfer to CAI of assets from Crédit Lyonnais' Corporate and Investment Banking division. The division was rebranded Crédit Agricole Corporate & Investment Bank (CACIB) in February 2010.

In September 2022, Xavier Musca has been appointed CEO of CACIB, in replacement of Jacques Ripoll

Business Lines
Its activities are arranged into eight major divisions: Client Coverage & International Network, Debt Optimization & Distribution, Global Investment Bank, Global Markets Division, Structured Finance, International Trade & Transaction Banking, Sustainable Banking and niche activities (Islamic Banking and RMB offer).

Client Coverage & International Network
Coverage dedicated to large French corporate and international clients.

Debt Optimization & Distribution
Debt Optimisation and Distribution business line, covering corporates and financial institutions, is dedicated to the origination, structuring and arrangement of syndicated and bilateral medium-term and long-term loans. It is also in charge of underwriting and of primary and secondary distribution of syndicated loans to banks and non-bank institutional investors.

Global Investment Bank
In France and throughout the world, Global Investment Banking helps the Bank's clients by advising them on issues related to "top-half of the balance sheet" (i.e. equity) transactions and structuring and executing specialised financing (Telecom Finance and Structured Financial Solutions).

Global Markets Division
Global Markets handles all sales and trading activities on the primary and secondary markets (rates, credit, foreign exchange, fixed-income, securitisation and treasury) for products designed for corporates, financial institutions and large issuers. These trading and sales entities are supported by research departments.

Structured Finance
The Structured Finance business consists in originating, structuring, and financing operations involving large-scale investments in France and abroad, often backed by collateral security (e.g. aircraft, ships, corporate real estate, or commodities), as well as complex and structured loans.

International Trade & Transaction Banking

Sustainable Banking
Crédit Agricole CIB advises its clients on operations integrating social and environmental considerations.

Niche Activities: Islamic banking and RMB offer 
Crédit Agricole CIB developed sharia compliant products and services and a full range of Renminbi services.

Historical Lines
In 2011, Crédit Agricole CIB announced the closing of equity derivatives and commodities.

See also

 Calyon Financial 
 Crédit Agricole
 Crédit Lyonnais

References

Crédit Agricole subsidiaries
Investment banks
Banks established in 2004
French companies established in 2004